Kulband (also Romanized as Kūlband and Kūl Band) is a village in Itivand-e Jonubi Rural District, Kakavand District, Delfan County, Lorestan Province, Iran. At the 2006 census, its population was 36, in 6 families.

References 

Towns and villages in Delfan County